Park Jae-Myong (born 15 December 1981) is a South Korean javelin thrower. His personal best throw is 83.99 metres, achieved in March 2004 in Wellington. This is the current South Korean record.

Achievements

Seasonal bests by year
2000 – 75.87
2001 – 76.00
2002 – 80.96
2003 – 81.46
2004 – 83.99
2005 – 78.87
2006 – 79.96
2007 – 80.38
2008 – 81.42
2009 – 83.10
2010 – 80.11
2011 – 80.19
2012 – 78.60
2013 – 79.71
2014 – 78.69

References

1981 births
Living people
South Korean male javelin throwers
Athletes (track and field) at the 2004 Summer Olympics
Athletes (track and field) at the 2008 Summer Olympics
Olympic athletes of South Korea
Asian Games medalists in athletics (track and field)
Athletes (track and field) at the 2002 Asian Games
Athletes (track and field) at the 2006 Asian Games
Athletes (track and field) at the 2010 Asian Games
Athletes (track and field) at the 2014 Asian Games
Universiade medalists in athletics (track and field)
Asian Games gold medalists for South Korea
Asian Games silver medalists for South Korea
Medalists at the 2006 Asian Games
Medalists at the 2010 Asian Games
Universiade bronze medalists for South Korea